The Biscúter Pegasín (or 200-F) was a microcar from Autonacional. It was revealed in 1957 in an attempt to attract the wealthier buyers. It was more upscale than the very basic Biscúter and it had two-colour plastic body, hard- and soft-top. The styling was similar to the Pegaso Z-102. By the early 1960s, Biscúter sales and production stopped, after a total production run of about 12,000. It is thought that almost all of the cars were eventually scrapped.

External links
 1957 Biscuter Pegasin

Microcars
Front-wheel-drive sports cars
Cars of Spain
Cars introduced in 1957